Creatures of Middle-earth is a 1988 role-playing game supplement published by Iron Crown Enterprises for Middle-earth Role Playing.

Publication history
Creatures of Middle-earth: A Bestiary of Animals and Monsters was written by Ruth Sochard Pitt, Jeff O'Hare, and Peter C. Fenlon, Jr., with a cover by Angus McBride, and illustrations by Jim Holloway, and was published by Iron Crown Enterprises in 1988 as a 64-page book.

Reviews
Dragon #151

References

Middle-earth Role Playing supplements
Role-playing game supplements introduced in 1988